Matios is a Ukrainian surname. Notable people with the surname include:

 Anatolii Matios (born 1969), Ukrainian colonel general
 Maria Matios (born 1959), Ukrainian poet, novelist, and official

See also
 Mateos
 Matias

Ukrainian-language surnames